Jasmeen Manzoor is a Pakistani journalist and news anchor working at Bol Network, Pakistan.

Early life and education
She earned her Masters in International Relations and started her career as an anchor on Pakistan Television in 1999. She worked as producer and talk show host on private TV channels. In March 2010, Jasmeen started hosting SAMAA TV's current affair program Tonight with Jasmeen. 
Jasmeen made documentaries receiving four awards, one of which was the Benazir Excellence Award for Best Female Anchor in Pakistan in 2009.

Controversy with MQM
In July 2013, Manzoor claimed that she was receiving death threats from the Muttahida Qaumi Movement (MQM) and she decided to leave Karachi. Jasmeen attacked the Karachi-based political party, avoiding naming the MQM directly. After hearing her story, Prime Minister Nawaz Sharif announced that he would review the law and order situation in the metropolis.

References

1964 births
Pakistani women journalists
Living people
Pakistani television talk show hosts
Journalists from Karachi
Hindkowan people